is a Japanese manga series by Chie Shinkyu. It has been serialized by Tokuma Shoten in the seinen manga magazine Monthly Comic Zenon since the September 2011 issue; it is also available on Web Comic Zenyon. The series has thirteen volumes so far; the first volume was released in May 2013, and the latest upcoming release in August 2019.

It was adapted into a Japanese television drama by North Stars Pictures starring Rina Takeda, and an short-length anime television series by Office DCI aired from July 5, 2015, to September 20, 2015. Season 1 of the live action adaptation was aired April 3, 2015, followed by the second season, released on January 8, 2016, and the third season, released on April 7, 2017. After a year hiatus, the fourth season aired on January 7, 2019. On October 24, 2019, TV Tokyo and Monthly Comic Zenon simultaneously announced that the Season 5 of the live-action adaptation will air in January 2020.

All adaptations, both anime and live-action of Wakakozake was broadcast on TV Tokyo and BS Japan. The anime is currently streaming on Crunchyroll, with the platform also streaming two early seasons of the live-action adaptation, both are distributed by SPO Entertainment. As of 2019, it is unknown when Crunchyroll will release Season 3, 4, and 5 of the live-action Wakakozake.

A spin-off manga written by Nenzu Nyanbara titled Taishū Sakaba Wakao - Wakako-zake Betten has been serialized in Tokuma Shoten's Web Comic Zenyon since January 2019 and will end with the release of its seventh volume.

Premise 

The series follows the daily adventures of Wakako Murasaki, an ordinary 26-year-old salary woman. After a tiring day's work, she goes off alone to explore various local restaurants, pubs, food stalls and the like and tries out random Japanese food that she usually pairs up with an alcoholic beverage.

She is said to be a drinker girl with a taste for liquor. Whenever her drink compliments her food, Wakako shows her contentment with a sigh of "pshuu" (プシュー).

Oftentimes, Wakako goes to faraway cities as well to try out cuisines or even go out with her close friends. In the first few seasons of the live action, she also stays at home or visits others to cook with her friends or try out cuisines from venues rather than actual restaurants.

Characters 
Murasaki Wakako (Wakako Murasaki)
Voice TV Anime Version – Sawashiro Miyuki (Miyuki Sawashiro) / Takahashi Minami (Minami Takahashi)
The 26 years old main character. Originally from Hiroshima she works as an office lady in Tokyo.
Miura (Miura)
Voice TV Anime Version – 
The nickname is "Mi-san". A bright and cheerful woman working in the same department as Wakako.
Nakano (Nakano)
Voice TV Anime Version – 
The nickname is "Hossie". A firm woman who works in the same department as Wakako.
Shiraishi (Shiraishi)
Voice TV Anime Version – 
A junior man whose Wakako serves as a teaching staff.
Chief Okada
Voice TV Anime Version – 
Male serving as chief in the department to which Wakako belongs.
Stupid
Voice TV Anime Version – 
A married man who is one of Wakako's friends.
Hiroki
Voice TV Anime Version – 
Wakako's relationship.

Bibliography 
"Wakako Sake" by Chie Shinkyu (新久千映), 8 volumes already published (as of January 20, 2017)
  (May 20, 2013)
  (December 20, 2013)
  (August 20, 2014)
  (December 20, 2014)
  (November, 2014) In addition
  (July 18, 2015)
  (January 20, 2016)
  (Anime DVD with 12 episodes (main part: 24 minutes) with 6 volumes limited edition)
  (July 20, 2016)
  (January 20, 2017)

Reception 
It was ranked 10th in 2014 Recommended comic selected by nationwide writing clerk (全国書店員が選んだおすすめコミック).

TV series 
The live-adaptation of manga series Wakakozake is produced by North Stars Pictures, TV Tokyo and RCC Broadcasting. Released from 2015 to 2019 (hiatus in 2018), the drama series consists of 12 episodes of 30-minutes each. Followed by the announcement from the volume 3 of the manga, which began selling on August 24, 2014, casts was announced in October that same year.

Season 1 was released on April 3 until July 30, 2015, Season 2 was released on January 8 until April 1, 2016, Season 3 was released on April 7 until June 23, 2017, and currently, Season 4 was released on January 7 until March 25, 2019. Season 5 was released in April 2020, followed by a special aired on December 29–30 that year. Due to COVID-19 pandemic, the series took another hiatus in 2021, and Season 6 was aired on January 10, 2022.

Japanese actress Rina Takeda played the titular character Murasaki Wakako on all seasons of the series, alongside recurring casts Yoshihiro Nozoe and Kenta Kamakari. All seasons of the series are broadcast on TV Tokyo and BS Japan respectively. Currently, Crunchyroll broadcast the first two seasons of the series.

Cast (as of 2019) 
 Rina Takeda as Murasaki Wakako
 Yoshihiro Nozoe as Taishō, the owner of a restaurant that Wakako frequently visits
 Kenta Kamakari as Aoyagi, Wakako's coworker
 Masaru Hotta
 Kinuo Yamada
 Mizuki Watanabe
 Kyo Nagai as Shiraishi
 Saiko Takayuki
 Kato Yutaka
 Shinya Hasegawa (長谷川慎也]
 Kohei Shiotsuka
 Takaya Aoyagi
 Shingo Mizusawa (S2 - Ep. 9)
 Chukichi Kubo (S2 - Ep. 9)
 Hiroaki Morooka (S2 - Ep. 6)
 Hisashi Yoshizawa (S2 - Ep. 4)

Korean TV drama 
Cheers to Me (나에게 건배, Naege Geonbae) was the Korean remake of the series, released on South Korea on December 10, 2015, until January 7, 2016, 10 episodes with 25 minutes, original network UMAX Network and O'live.

An ordinary single woman who enjoys cooking and dining alone in the evenings, Ra Yeo Joo is an editor at a publishing house where she's worked for the past ten years, while Lee Jae Yoon works in marketing at the same company. Their relationship is sometimes friendly, sometimes flirty, and sometimes competitive. They have different approaches to food: while she finds healing in food and drink, his goal in life is to live lean and long, until he discovers new pleasures and changes because of her.

Cast 
 Lee Jae Yoon as Lee Jae Yoon
 Yoon Jin Seo as Ra Yeo Joo
 Bae Noo Ri as Hong Se Im
 Kim Nan Hee
 Rina Takeda
 So Hee Jung

Soundtrack (Japanese) 
 Hoshi Tachi no Moment / Slow Motion [Regular Edition] by Yuka Ueno (March 18, 2015) 
 Hoshi Tachi no Moment / Slow Motion [w/ DVD, Limited Edition] by Yuka Ueno (March 18, 2015) 
 Anata no Kuni no Merry Go Round [CD+DVD] by Charan-Po-Rantan (July 1, 2015)
 DISC 1
 ANATA NO KUNI NO MERRY-GO-ROUND (貴方の国のメリーゴーランド / チャラン・ポ・ランタン)
 NAKIGAO PIERROT (泣き顔ピエロ / チャラン・ポ・ランタン)
 KONO SAKI NO SCENARIO HA ANATA SHIDAI (この先のシナリオはあなた次第 / チャラン・ポ・ランタン)
 71OKU PIECE NO PUZZLE GAME -UTA TO ACCORDION VER.- (71億ピースのパズルゲーム -唄とアコーディオン ver.- / チャラン・ポ・ランタン)
 DISC 2
 ANATA NO KUNI NO MERRY-GO-ROUND (MUSIC VIDEO) (貴方の国のメリーゴーランド (Music Video) / チャラン・ポ・ランタン)
 SHIMAI NO KIROKU NO KIROKU -71OKU PIECE NO PUZZLE GAME -UTA TO ACCORDION VER.-- (姉妹の記録の記録 ～71億ピースのパズルゲーム -唄とアコーディオン ver.-～)
 Anata no Kuni no Merry Go Round by Charan-Po-Rantan (July 1, 2015)
 ANATA NO KUNI NO MERRY-GO-ROUND (貴方の国のメリーゴーランド / チャラン・ポ・ランタン)
 NAKIGAO PIERROT (泣き顔ピエロ / チャラン・ポ・ランタン)
 KONO SAKI NO SCENARIO HA ANATA SHIDAI (この先のシナリオはあなた次第 / チャラン・ポ・ランタン)
 71OKU PIECE NO PUZZLE GAME -UTA TO ACCORDION VER.- (71億ピースのパズルゲーム -唄とアコーディオン ver.- / チャラン・ポ・ランタン)

TV animation 
It was broadcast from July 5 to September 20, 2015, short animation of 3 minutes.

Broadcasting station (TV animation) 
Japan domestic television / broadcasting period and broadcasting time.
 TOKYO MX (Jul 5 – Sep 20, 2015) Sunday 22:27 – 22:30
 Sun Television (Jul 5 – Sep 20, 2015) Sunday 22:27 – 22:30, Sunday 22:25 – 22:30 :ja:電子番組ガイド:ja:ワカコ酒#cite note-62
 NECO (Dec 5, 2015) Saturday 23:50 – 23:55 :ja:ワカコ酒#cite note-63
 Kyoto Broadcasting System (Jan 10, 2017) Tuesday 1:30 – 1:35 (Monday midnight)
Japan domestic Internet distribution / broadcasting period and broadcasting time.
 MX CASTING (Jul 5, 2015) Sunday 22:27 – 22:30 Simultaneous with TOKYO MX.
 Cinemart (シネマート) Sunday 22:30
 Niconico (Jul 8 – Sep 23, 2015) Wednesday 0:00 (Tuesday midnight)
 Yahoo! Japan (Jul 8 – Sep 23, 2015) Wednesday 0:00 (Tuesday midnight)

Media

Episode list (anime)

Related items

DVD 
Wakakozake DVD Box (ワカコ酒　DVD-BOX（4枚組・本編Disc3枚+特典Disc1枚）) 

DVD box set release from TV series "Wakakozake" starring Rina Takeda. Includes all the 12 episodes. Comes with a bonus disc and a gourmet booklet. May 1, 2015, by SPO Entertainment.

Wakako Zake Hiroshima Gourmet Hen Director's Cut Ver. (ワカコ酒　広島グルメ編　ディレクターズカット版) 

Director's cut version of the tenth episode of TV series "Wakako Zake" featuring foods in Hiroshima Prefecture. Stars Rina Takeda. Comes with a gourmet map of Hiroshima.

Special Feature / Bonus Track: making-of the 10th night (25 min. approx.), dialogue between Chie Shinkyu x Rina Takeda. May 20, 2015, by SPO Entertainment.

Blu-ray 
Wakako Zake, Animation (アニメ「ワカコ酒」) . October 2, 2015 by SPO Entertainment.

Features complete 12 episodes with booklet. Special Feature / Bonu Track: interview with Miyuki Sawashiro, and more.

Book 
Wakakozake Recipe Book (ワカコ酒　レシピブック) JAN/

June 19, 2015, by Asahi Shimbun Publications.

Watashi mo Konya wa Wakako Zake (TOWN) (わたしも今夜はワカコ酒（タウンムック本）) JAN/

July 15, 2015, by Tokuma Shoten.

References

External links 
 Official website 
 Media Arts manga volumes  
 Cheers to Me (in Korean)
 

2015 anime television series debuts
Cooking in anime and manga
Iyashikei anime and manga
Seinen manga
Tokuma Shoten manga
Alcohol in popular culture